Major Dhyan Chand Sports College, Saifai, earlier known as Saifai Sports College is a college and sports academy in Saifai, Etawah district of Uttar Pradesh. It was established in 2014 in Saifai, Etawah district, Uttar Pradesh as Saifai Sports College by state government. It offers sports training in athletics, cricket, football, hockey, wrestling, kabaddi, swimming, badminton and judo in sixth to twelfth standard with the curriculum of U.P. Board. It is the third sports college established  in Uttar Pradesh after Guru Gobind Singh Sports College of Lucknow and Beer Bahadur Singh Sports College in Gorakhpur.

Sports training
College provides training of the following sports:

Boy students
Athletics, cricket, football, hockey, wrestling, kabaddi, swimming and badminton

Girl students
Badminton, judo and athletics

Campus
It is a residential campus and due to it overall weight is borne by the government of Uttar Pradesh. The boy square of college gets sports training in cricket, football, hockey, wrestling, athletics, badminton, swimming and kabaddi as well as they get teaching from sixth to twelfth standard by the curriculum of Board of High School and Intermediate Education, Uttar Pradesh. In this Sports College, number of trainees is determine as 560. In the first year 74 trainees started studying here.

Facilities

Sports facilities
 Saifai International Cricket Stadium (in campus)
 Synthetic running track or athletes stadium (in campus)
 Indoor Stadium (in campus)
 Swimming pools (an International All-weather Swimming pool in campus and an old one at Master Chandgiram Sports Stadium, Saifai)
 Hockey field astroturf (at Master Chandgiram Sports Stadium, Saifai)
 Three grass fields (in campus)
 Basketball courts (in campus)
 Tennis court (in campus)

Other facilities/buildings
 Admin & education block
 Hostel
 Dispensary
 Guest house
 Faculty accommodation
 Electrical substation

References

External links
 

Sport in Uttar Pradesh
Intermediate colleges in Uttar Pradesh
Universities and colleges in Saifai
Educational institutions established in 2014
Sport schools in India
Uttar Pradesh Sports Colleges Society
Sport in Saifai
2014 establishments in Uttar Pradesh